The Show-Me Institute, or SMI, is an American think tank based in St. Louis, Missouri that promotes public policies that advance free market principles. Founded in 2005, the organization focuses on economic and good governance issues in the state of Missouri. The stated mission of the Show-Me Institute is "improving the quality of life for all citizens of Missouri by advancing sensible, well-researched solutions to state and local policy issues." The Institute opened a branch office in Kansas City in 2014.

Policy positions

Although SMI does not typically take "institutional" positions, the research of SMI analysts tends to converge in support of small government principles that maximize both economic efficiency in the Missouri economy and individual freedom for Missourians.

Taxation

SMI research supports low broad-based taxes and a move away from income taxes as keys to economic growth in Missouri. The first paper published by the institute, written by Joseph Haslag in 2006, explored how the 1 percent earnings taxes of Kansas City and St. Louis damaged growth in those cities. An essay published in 2012 by Patrick Ishmael and Michael Rathbone called for the elimination of the corporate income tax through the elimination of economic development tax incentives. In 2019, Patrick Tuohey and Graham Renz explored tax increment financing, community improvement district and other local taxing districts, finding that the districts could often be formed with little public input and that many districts lacked sufficient oversight of the revenues collected.

Spending

Research by Ishmael and Adam Millsap, published in 2017, explored the relationship between state & local government spending growth and private sector gross state product (GSP) growth. The paper raised concerns about the compounding effects of deadweight losses caused by state governments driving larger and larger portions of their GSP, observing that "[in] a state where government expenditures grow faster than the private sector economy as a whole, the amount of resources the government controls increases over time." The paper included the author-named "IM Index" ranking of states from 2004 to 2013, which compared states based on their overall exposure to these spending and deadweight loss risks.

Health care

The institute is skeptical of socialized medicine and has criticized the Affordable Care Act. Researchers have written in support of block-granting Medicaid and proposals that would financially incentivize non-long term care beneficiaries to shop for services and voluntarily leave the program. The institute has also written against certificate of need laws and in support of health savings accounts, direct primary care, licensure reform and insurance market deregulation.

Government transparency

Researchers have supported the expanded use of digital recording, including video and online streaming, of government hearings, including the allowance of outside recording devices when government organs decline to record proceedings themselves. Researchers have also advocated for greater local government transparency, particularly for spending records of municipal, county, and special taxing districts.

Education

Researchers have supported a variety of school choice initiatives, including education savings accounts, support for charter schools, and greater flexibility in merit pay for high performing teachers.

Workforce development and labor policies

SMI researchers have supported the expansion of apprenticeship programs and a diversification of the state's educational portfolio to better fund blue collar career tracks. Institute researchers view government labor unions as inherently problematic.

Board of directors
As of 2019:
Crosby Kemper III, executive director of the Kansas City Public Library and former CEO of UMB Financial Corporation
 Rex Sinquefield, co-founder and former co-chairman of Dimensional Fund Advisors
 Michael Podgursky, professor of economics
 Louis Griesemer, Chairman of the Board of Springfield Underground, Inc.
 W. Bevis Schock, attorney
 Joe Forshaw, past president and CEO of Forshaw, a family-owned business
 Stephen F. Brauer, chairman and CEO of Hunter Engineering Company; former ambassador to Belgium
 Jennifer Bukowsky, attorney
 James G. Forsyth III, president and CEO of Moto, Inc.
 Robert M. Heller, former judge
 Megan Holekamp, real estate broker at Janet McAfee Inc.
 Gregg Keller, political consultant
 Gerald A. Reynolds, former general counsel, chief compliance officer and corporate secretary for LG&E and KU Energy
 Kevin Short, co-founder and managing partner/CEO of Clayton Capital Partners

Affiliations
The Show-Me Institute is an affiliate of the State Policy Network, an American network of free-market oriented think tanks.

References

External links 
 
 Organizational Profile – National Center for Charitable Statistics (Urban Institute)

Politics of Missouri
Political and economic think tanks in the United States
Tax reform in the United States
Libertarian think tanks
Libertarian organizations based in the United States